Simrall is a surname. Notable people with the surname include:

Horatio F. Simrall (1818–1901), American Confederate politician
James Simrall (1909–1982), American football player